Juuse Saros (born 19 April 1995) is a Finnish professional ice hockey goaltender for the Nashville Predators of the National Hockey League (NHL). Saros was selected by the Predators in the fourth round (99th overall) of the 2013 NHL Entry Draft.

Playing career

Saros was born in Forssa but grew up in Hämeenlinna. He played his entire youth career and first three professional seasons with hometown club, HPK of the Liiga. On 16 June 2015, he was signed to a three-year, entry-level contract with the Nashville Predators, having been drafted by Nashville in the 2013 NHL Entry Draft.

Saros was named to the 2012–13 Jr. A SM-Liiga All-Star Team and was a member of Team Finland at the IIHF U18 World Junior Championships where he was named the tournament's Best Goaltender.

Saros was on the Finland Team in the 2014 IIHF Ice Hockey Championships.

Saros made his NHL debut on 28 November 2015, against the Buffalo Sabres. He won his first NHL game on 22 October 2016, against the Pittsburgh Penguins. Saros recorded his first NHL shutout on 30 December 2016, making 25 saves against the St. Louis Blues. He set a franchise record for the most saves in a shutout on 14 December 2017, making 46 saves against the Edmonton Oilers.

On 16 July 2018, he was re-signed by the Predators to a three-year, $4.5 million contract.

On 16 August 2021, Saros was signed to a four-year, $20 million extension with the Predators. The 2021–22 season was one of Saros' strongest, and he was widely credited as a key factor in the Predators qualifying for the 2022 Stanley Cup playoffs. He was a finalist for the Vezina Trophy, awarded to the league's best goaltender. Saros suffered a foot injury in the final week of the regular season that took him out of the postseason entirely, dubbed "a real dagger" to the Predators' playoff hopes. With Saros absent, the team was swept by the Colorado Avalanche in the first round. On 5 January 2023, Saros made a franchise-record 64 saves in the Predators' 5–3 win over the Carolina Hurricanes.

Career statistics

Regular season and playoffs

Awards and honours

References

External links
 

1995 births
Living people
Finnish ice hockey goaltenders
HPK players
Milwaukee Admirals players
Nashville Predators draft picks
Nashville Predators players
People from Hämeenlinna
Sportspeople from Kanta-Häme